PAIN is the third studio album released by the hard rock band Rhino Bucket. It was released on June 1, 1994 by Moonstone Records. The album was their first release with Simon Wright (formerly of AC/DC) as drummer.

Track listing
 Pain (4:34)
 I Stand Before You (6:14)
 Too Much Talk (4:36)
 Blow By Blow (4:27)
 Mad Maggie (3:38)
 Bird on a Wire (5:25)
 What'd You Expect (4:48)
 I Was Told (3:47)
 The Hard Grind (4:16)
 World Gone Mad (5:06)

Personnel
Georg Dolivo: lead vocals, rhythm guitar
Greg Fields: lead guitar, backing vocals
Reeve Downes: bass guitar, backing vocals
Simon Wright: drums
All songs written by Rhino Bucket.

1994 albums
Rhino Bucket albums